Mary Carroll may refer to:

 Mary Carroll (netball), Australian netball player
 Mary Carroll (translator), Australian translation specialist
 Mary Ellen Carroll (born 1961), American conceptual artist